The 2022 Northern Illinois Huskies football team represents Northern Illinois University as a member of the West Division of the Mid-American Conference (MAC) during the 2022 NCAA Division I FBS football season. The Huskies are led by fourth-year head coach Thomas Hammock and play home games at Huskie Stadium in DeKalb, Illinois.

Previous season

The Huskies finished the 2021 season 9–5, 6–2 in the MAC play to finish in first place in the West Division. They defeated Kent State 41–23 in the MAC Championship Game.  They received an invitation to the Cure Bowl where they lost to Coastal Carolina.

Preseason 
In the league's annual preseason poll, the Huskies were picked to win the West division. They were also picked to win the MAC Championship. Offensive linemen Nolan Porter and Logan Zschernitz, wide receiver Trayvon Rudolph, cornerback Jordan Gandy, and kicker John Richardson were named to the preseason first team. Offensive lineman Marques Cox and safety C.J. Brown were named to the second team.

Schedule
The Huskies played four non-conference games with visits to Tulsa and Kentucky and while hosting Eastern Illinois of the FCS and Vanderbilt at Huskie Stadium.

References

Northern Illinois
Northern Illinois Huskies football seasons
Northern Illinois Huskies football